Stadion An der Alten Försterei is a football stadium in Köpenick and the largest single-purpose football stadium in the German capital of Berlin. It has been home to football club 1. FC Union Berlin and its forerunners since its opening in 1920.

The stadium's capacity was last redeveloped in 2009 and expanded in 2013. Some of the redevelopment work was carried out by over 2,300 Union Berlin supporters volunteering their services. During league matches the arena features a total capacity of 22,012. There are 3,617 seats available whilst the rest of the ground remains terracing.

The stadium became also known for events like the annual "Weihnachtssingen" (Christmas Carols Event) and the "WM-Wohnzimmer" (World Cup Living Room) in 2014.

History

1920–1966
SC Union Oberschöneweide (forerunner of today's 1. FC Union Berlin) had to find a new home ground in 1920, as its former pitch had been built over by developers with residential buildings. The club moved a little further away from the city to the north-western part of the borough of Köpenick. The new stadium was officially opened in August 1920 with a match between Oberschöneweide and the then German champions 1. FC Nürnberg (1–2). The inaugural match at the Alte Försterei had already been played on 17 March, when Union challenged Viktoria 89 Berlin – an illustrious club who had won the German Championship three times around the turn of the century – to a friendly.

Since 1966

When Union won promotion to the DDR-Oberliga (the top flight in East Germany) in 1966, the stadium soon needed to be expanded. The ground was first expanded in 1970 when the Gegengerade terrace was raised, whilst further extensions to the terracing at both ends in the late 1970s and early 1980s increased the capacity furthermore to 22,500.

However, the somewhat spartan facilities at Alte Försterei had quickly begun to show their age though, as the club was not able to properly maintain the expansive ground as attendances – in common with the majority of clubs in the East and West – went into a serious decline. Later, after German reunification, when Union were assigned by the German Football Association to play in the 3rd league, the outdated stadium proved only one of a number of factors that hampered the club's push for promotion to higher leagues.

Prior to the redevelopment in 2008, the terracing at the ground was in such a poor state of repair that its continued use was only on condition of the capacity being drastically cut to 18,100 spectators. In the late 1990s, Union were only allowed to continue playing at the Alte Försterei on the basis of special temporary licenses until the DFL (German Football League) stopped continue renewing these in 2006, meaning the stadium would soon no longer be eligible to stage any matches in the top three tiers of German football. The club were therefore forced to make a decision as to whether they would redevelop the Alte Försterei or make a permanent move to a different ground, something that which was unlikely to have been approved by large sections of the fan base who consider the ground to be the club's spiritual home.

Redevelopment

Phase 1 

In the late 1990s the first plans for the future of Union's home began to be drawn up. After several years of planning and discussion on various proposals, the redevelopment of the Alte Försterei finally began at the end of the 2007/08 season. Along with the main work of replacing the crumbling stone and cinder terracing with concrete terracing and installing a roof over the previously open terraces, many other minor improvements were completed, such as the installation of new perimeter fencing, new seats in the main stand and undersoil heating and a digital scoreboard (although the famous old manual scoreboard in the corner between the Gegengerade terrace and the Zuckertor (waldseite) end of the ground has been retained). Most of the work during the redevelopment was carried out by over 2,300 supporters volunteering their services. Specialist firms were only called in for more complex tasks such as installing the cantilever roof.

After playing their home matches at the Friedrich-Ludwig-Jahn-Sportpark in Berlin's Prenzlauer Berg district during the 2008/09 season, the stadium was re-opened on 8 July 2009 in time for a friendly against fellow Berlin side Hertha BSC.

Phase 2 

Originally planned for 2010, the second stage of refurbishment commenced when funding was insured in May 2012 with the deconstruction of the old main stand. The foundation-stone for the new, 3,617-capacity stand was laid in the following month. Work on it was completed in the summer of 2013, when the fully renovated stadium was inaugurated with a friendly match between Union and Celtic F.C.

The new building, which is 100.5 m wide and 23.5 m high, also includes hospitality, media and other functional facilities. The costs for its construction were planned to amount to 15 million €, of which 2 million where contributed by the club. Sponsors accounted for 10 million. A further 3 million were injected by a holding formed to own and manage to stadium, shares in which were made publicly available.  Over four thousand members of the club and sponsors bought shares in the company so formed for 2.7 million €.

In its new form, the stadium was sold out for the first time on 31 August 2013, when 21,717 spectators saw Union beat FC St. Pauli 3–2.

Events
Since the redevelopment, the stadium has also been used for a small number of non-football events, among them rock concerts and bike shows.

Christmas Carols Singing

Union Berlin is well known for its Christmas traditions celebrated in their home stadium. In 2003 the yearly Union Weihnachtssingen (Christmas Carols Singing) started as an unofficial gathering to which just 89 fans showed up. In 2013, 27,500 people attended, including players and supporters of other teams from around Germany and Europe. Fans drink Glühwein (mulled wine), wave candles around, light flares and sing a combination of Christmas carols and football chants.

World Cup Living Room
In 2014 the club came up with the idea of inviting fans to take their own sofas to the ground for the whole of the World Cup. The event was called WM Wohnzimmer (World Cup Living Room). More than 800 sofas were placed on the pitch in rows in front of the big screen.

Concerts
On 3 September 2015, Linkin Park played the first ever music show in the stadium. They performed in front of 35,000 fans.

See also

Football in Germany
Football in Berlin
Sport in Berlin

References

External links 

Page on official Union Berlin website  
 Stadium official website 
Virtual Tour FootballStadiums360

Football venues in Berlin
Football venues in East Germany
1. FC Union Berlin
Buildings and structures in Treptow-Köpenick
1920 establishments in Germany
Sports venues completed in 1920